Listen to Me, Girls. I Am Your Father!, known in Japan as 
The first volume was published by Shueisha under their Super Dash Bunko imprint December 2009. As of March 2015, eighteen volumes have been released. A manga adaptation drawn by Yōhei Takemura started serialization in the September 2011 issue of Jump Square, with several spin-off manga series also launching in the same year. An anime television series adaptation by Feel aired in Japan between January 11, 2012, and March 27, 2012, with an original video animation released on June 25, 2013. A video game by Bandai Namco Entertainment was released for the PlayStation Portable on April 26, 2012.

Plot
Yuuta Segawa is in his freshman year of college. He and his older sister Yuri were orphaned as children but when their relatives tried to separate and send them to live in different foster homes, Yuri chose to raise him on her own. Now, many years later, Yuri, who has since married, asks Yuuta to babysit her daughter, Hina, and two step-daughters, Sora and Miu Takanashi, while she and her husband go on a trip. Unfortunately, the plane Yuri and her husband are on crashes and they are both reported missing and presumed dead. A similar event unfolds, and in order to prevent the girls being separated from each other, Yuuta takes it upon himself to look after the girls in his small apartment, thus begins Yuuta's story of sharing his everyday life with his three nieces.

Characters

Main characters

The main character, a college first-year student just starting a new life in the School of Literature at Tama University. His parents died when he and his sister were young and to prevent them from being separated, his sister, Yuri, decided to raise him herself. Years later, when Yuri and her husband go missing, Yuuta makes the decision to become the guardian of their three daughters so that they are not separated, as some of the Takanashi relatives plan to do. His reliable and kind nature soon wins him the respect and affection of the three sisters, especially Sora, who has had a crush on him since their first meeting. He has feelings for Raika, a second-year university student and fellow club member, but cannot seem to find the right time or way to express his feelings to her. After two months and several adventures with the girls, the Takanashi family come to accept him as a capable guardian for the sisters. They increase their financial support and give Yuuta shared title to his sister's big house in Ikebukuro allowing him and the girls to move out of his six-mat room apartment. Four years after his sister and brother-in-law go missing, Yuuta and Sora decide to marry.

The eldest of the three half-sisters. She is 14 years old, a second-year middle school student, and has a tsundere personality. Notable for a strand of her neck length brown hair that curves forward and curls like a crescent. She has fairly good grades in school but is not adept at cooking. She has had a crush on Yuuta since they first met but starts out calling him "oji-san." When they become more comfortable with each other she starts referring to him as "onii-chan" even though they are not, strictly speaking, related. Since her first-year in junior high, Sora registers for the choir club to express her desire to sing. Yuuta is (perhaps purposefully) oblivious to her feelings. Sora does not like it when Yuuta pays attention to Raika as she is envious of both Raika's well-developed body and also her close relationship with Yuuta. Due to heavy responsibilities, Sora thought of resigning from her club, but with motivation from Kiyomi Okae the president, and Yuuta, Sora stays true to herself. In Volume 17, Sora begins her first-year in high school and earns top position of the choir club. She marries Yuuta during the events of volume 18.

The second eldest of the three half-sisters. She is a 10-year-old fifth grader. She has blonde hair as her biological mother is part of Russian lineage. She normally refers to Yuuta as Oji-san. She has a preference for guys who are older than her and manly. It is implied that she may have a slight crush on Yuuta, as she is particularly curious about his love life. She went on a date with Kouichi once. In the light novels, Miu started developing feelings for Yuuta at the end of volume 4. Sasha also makes an appearance in volume 4 planning to rightfully take Miu back, but Miu decides to stay with Yuuta and her half-sisters. In Volume 17, she begins her first-year in junior high school and becomes a singing idol.

The youngest of the three half-sisters. She is three years old and attends daycare. She is the biological daughter of Yuri and thus the only one of the three girls who is directly related to Yuuta. She is very friendly and unafraid of strangers. She sometimes mispronounces words, often leaving out certain consonants. She normally addresses Yuuta as Oji-san but has trouble with the "j" and "s" sounds so it comes out as Oi-tan (little uncle). She is a fan of the heroine anime, Luna Luna Seven. Whenever Hina mentions her parents' names, Yuuta and the elder sisters did their best to keep her cheerful till she emotionally accepts they're in heaven. In the OVA, she begun her second-grade in elementary school and speaks clearly.

Street Observation Research Society

A second-year student at Tama University School of Literature. She is the only female member in the Street Observation Research Society. Every time Sako has perverted thoughts or is crude, she beats him with a giant paper fan. Despite being very attractive, she does not reveal her emotions easily and dislikes talking with anyone except for Yuuta. Raika is a very good cook, particularly in Japanese cuisine and likes to tease Yuuta. She especially loves cute things, and upon encountering them her personality changes. This also applies to Yuuta's nieces including Sora, who does not like Raika because she is jealous of Raika's relationship with Yuuta; ironically see her a maternal figure.

A first-year student of Tama University School of Literature. He is a good friend of Yuuta's and a womanizer. He insists that his house is only for entertaining girls. As a result, he almost never stays at his home and instead spends time at Yuuta's apartment, or at one of his affairs' places. He is however a very caring friend and will help out with chores on his own initiative. He also helps Yuuta keep Sako away from his nieces and has a soft spot for Miu.

A third-year student of the Tama University School of Literature. He is the President of the Street Observation Research Society. Sako has been a third-year in the university ever since Raika enrolled. He is a lolicon and wears thick glasses. He once told Raika that "Love is justice. Love is the strongest." to justify his lolicon fetishes to which Raika later agrees. Despite this she frequently beats him on with a paper fan when he goes overboard. He has taken a certain interest in Yuuta's nieces, excluding Sora, whom he claims she is too old for him despite being only 14, and usually calls her "Oba-chan" (old lady). Sako actually proves himself to be a reliable friend.

Others

Yuuta's older sister, Miu's and Sora's stepmother, and Hina's mother. When their parents died, she decided to raise Yuuta by herself so that they would not be separated. She passed down the Twinkle, Twinkle, Little Star song to her family. She married Shingo while Yuuta was in high school. When Yuuta found out that her husband-to-be had been previously married and already had two kids, Miu and Sora, he became extremely frustrated. After cooling down, he realized that he was in no position to deny his sister's happiness. On the way back to apologize for his temper, he saw Sora and tended her scraped palm - the origin of her crush on him. When the flight that Yuri and Shingo were on goes missing, Yuuta chooses to take her kids into his custody to prevent them from being separated. Her spirit, alongside her husband appeared in the OVA, while secretly cheering for Sora and Yuuta.

Yuri's husband. He hails from a wealthy family and is a genuinely kind man. He was previously married twice and each time had one child. Sora's mother died and Miu's mother divorced him. He and Yuri met at an otaku convention: she was cosplaying (a habit she hid from Yuuta) and he was a photographer. Shingo kept a collection of photographs of Yuri and the girls cosplaying. He appeared with Yuri in the OVA.

Yuuta's next-door neighbor. She works as a voice actress and previously worked as a villain on Hina's favorite anime series. She plays with Hina and Miu during her spare time.

Yuuta's rather inflexible landlady. She would have evicted Yuuta and the girls from their apartment, had it not been for the timely intervention of her mother, the real landlady. At 29-years-old, she is still single and seems to be jealous of young couples. Like many adults in the story, she develops a soft spot for Hina. She only appears in the anime adaption and the Takanashi no Hidamari manga; in the light novel Yuuta's landlord is an unnamed male with a minor role.

Miu's friend and next-door neighbor of the Takanashi's Ikebukuro household. In the manga, she is protective of the sisters and is initially cold towards Yuuta, feeling he is not a worthy guardian. However, after seeing how reliable he actually is, she starts to develop feelings for him.

Yuuta's paternal aunt. She initially allowed him to care for the Takanashi sisters as a pain reliever for the loss of Shingo and Yuri till they found a proper adult to raise all three, and does not see Yuuta as worthy guardian for his nieces. Deep down Yoshiko regretted not having courage to raise little Yuuta. She and Nobuyoshi at least get to witness her nephew improve as a young man and a father-figure, and has come to accept the siblings' closeness to each other.

Shingo's paternal uncle. Unlike Yoshiko, Nobuyoshi is a much more competitor relative of the family; he carries Shingo's past relationships as his own failures. Nobuyoshi does not accept Yuuta as a legitimate guardian for the girls in any regard, but as of now he is okay with just short agreements. In Takanashi no Hidamari manga, Yoshiko persuades Nobuyoshi to see Yuuta and the elder sisters showing parental attendance at Hina's preschool, sensing the silhouettes of Yuri and Shingo, Nobuyoshi redeems and offers Yuuta the deed to the Takanashi's Ikebukuro house.

Shingo's ex-wife and Miu's biological mother. She had a brief happiness with Shingo until their relationship became sour due to family crisis, and left Miu in Shingo's care and moved to Russia. Her career is well known to be a fashion designer. After Shingo and Yuri's disappearance, the relatives refuse to send Miu to live with Sasha, as she cannot speak the language. Sasha only appears in the OVA and seems to have reconciled with Miu. Sasha helps customize a formal wear for Yuuta and Sora's wedding.

Media

Light novels
 30-12-2009 
 28-02-2010 
 30-04-2010 
 30-09-2010 
 30-11-2011 
 30-01-2011 
 30-05-2011  (Short Stories)
 27-09-2011 
 25-01-2012 
 25-05-2012 
 25-10-2012 
 22-02-2013 
 25-06-2013  (with an OVA)
 25-10-2013 
 28-02-2014 
 25-06-2014 
 24-01-2015 
 24-03-2015  (with an OVA)
 23-07-2016  (After 1)

Manga
A manga adaptation illustrated by Yōhei Takemura was serialized in Shueisha's Jump Square manga magazine between September 2011 and April 2012. There are several other spin-off manga written by Matsu published in various Shueisha magazines. , which focuses on the people who encounter the Takanashi family, is illustrated by various authors and published in Ultra Jump from September 2011. , which focuses on Miu, is illustrated by Tomoo Katou and published in Cookie magazine from October 2011 to April 2012. , which focuses on Hina, was illustrated by Matsuda98 and published in Cobalt between November 2011 and March 2012. , which focuses on Sora, is illustrated by Ejiri Natsuki and published in Super Dash & Go magazine from December 2011. Finally, which focuses on the Street Observation Research Society, is illustrated by Miyano Hirotsugu and published in Weekly Young Jump magazine from December 2011.

Anime

An anime adaptation by Feel aired in Japan between January 11, 2012, and March 27, 2012, and was simulcast by Crunchyroll. An original video animation episode 13 was released with the 5th Blu-ray Disc/DVD volume released on July 11, 2012. Sentai Filmworks released the series as a subtitled DVD collection in North America on February 5, 2013. An additional OVA was bundled with the 13th light novel volume on June 25, 2013. The opening theme is "Happy Girl" by Eri Kitamura, whilst the ending theme is "Coloring" by Yui Horie. An additional OVA was bundled with the 18th light novel volume on March 25, 2015.

Visual novel
A visual novel video game was developed by Tenky and Banpresto and published by Namco Bandai Games was released for PlayStation Portable on April 26, 2012.

See also
 Chained Soldier – a manga series also illustrated by Yōhei Takemura

References

External links
 Official light novel website 
 Official manga website 
Official Videogame website 
Official anime website 

2009 Japanese novels
2011 manga
2012 anime television series debuts
Anime and manga based on light novels
Feel (animation studio)
Josei manga
Light novels
Novels about families
Novels set in Tokyo
Romantic comedy anime and manga
Seinen manga
Sentai Filmworks
Shōjo manga
Shōnen manga
Shueisha manga
Shueisha franchises
Super Dash Bunko
Television series about families
Works about adoption